Women's National League may refer to:

Sports

Basketball
Scottish Women's National League, a major basketball league in Scotland
Women's National Basketball League, a major basketball league in Australia

Cricket
Women's National Cricket League, the national competition for women's cricket in Australia

Association football (soccer)
Chinese Women's National League, the premier women's soccer competition in China
Women's National League (England), the third-tier women's soccer competition in England
Women's National League (Ireland), the premier women's soccer competition in the Republic of Ireland
National Women's Soccer League, the premier women's soccer competition in the United States

Futsal
Women's National Futsal League Malaysia, the premier women's futsal competition in Malaysia

Politics
Australian Women's National League, Australian women's lobby group founded in 1904
Women's Loyal National League, American women's anti-slavery group founded 1863

See also
 National Women's League (disambiguation)
 National League (disambiguation)